Khvajeh Safar was a Safavid official of Armenian origin, who served as the first mayor (kalāntar) of New Julfa (the Armenian quarter of Isfahan), from 1605 until his death in 1618. A member of the influential Shafraz family (also spelled Safraz), he was bestowed with the title by then incumbent king Abbas I (r. 1588-1629) in recognition of his father's (Khvajeh Khachik) rank of melik in Old Julfa, and his instant submission to Abbas I when the latter retook the area. The next three subsequent kalantars were all from Khvajeh Safar's family, while the last member of the family that held the post was Khvajeh Haikaz (1656-1660).

References

Sources
 
 
 

16th-century births
1618 deaths
Persian Armenians
Safavid mayors of New Julfa
17th-century people of Safavid Iran